USCGC Mackinaw (WLBB-30) is a  multi-purpose vessel with a primary mission as a heavy icebreaker specifically built for operations on the North American Great Lakes for the United States Coast Guard. IMO number: 9271054.

Her larger precursor, the USCGC Mackinaw (WAGB-83), IMO number 6119534, had a 62-year career on the same waters prior to being decommissioned on June 10, 2006, and turned into a museum ship docked in Mackinaw City, Michigan.

Among the missions the current Mackinaw is capable of and tasked with as needed is buoy tending, law enforcement and interdiction, search and rescue, and environmental remediation response.

Background
Mackinaw was delivered to the Coast Guard on November 18, 2005, and commissioned on June 10, 2006. In addition to her ice-breaking duties, the Mackinaw also serves as an Aids-to-Navigation ship, since she is able to perform the same duties as the Seagoing Buoy Tenders (WLB) of the Coast Guard fleet. Further, she can conduct law enforcement and search-and-rescue missions and can deploy an oil-skimming system to respond to oil-spill situations and environmental response.

Mechanical aspects

One of the Mackinaw'''s unique features in the US Coast Guard fleet is the use of two Azipod units, ABB's brand of electric azimuth thrusters, for her main propulsion. These, coupled with a  bow thruster, make the ship exceptionally maneuverable. The Azipod units also remove the need for a traditional rudder, as the thrusters can turn 360 degrees around their vertical axis to direct their thrust in any direction. The Mackinaw also lacks a traditional ship's steering wheel. Much of the ship’s technology, including the Azipod thrusters, is from Finnish Maritime Cluster.

History
The Mackinaw got off to a rocky start before being commissioned. While en route to her new home port of Cheboygan, Michigan, the Mackinaw struck a seawall in Grand Haven, Michigan on December 12, 2005. The accident caused a  dent in her starboard bow. Shortly after, Captain Donald Triner, the commanding officer of the Mackinaw, was temporarily relieved of duty pending an investigation into the event. The accident did not delay the ship, which arrival on schedule on December 17, 2005. Captain Triner was later permanently relieved of duty and replaced by Captain Michael Hudson.

The Mackinaw is stationed at Cheboygan, Michigan. It can be seen and toured at Grand Haven's Coast Guard Festival every summer. The ship was also featured on the television series Modern Marvels.

Captain Hudson was subsequently replaced by Commander John Little in April 2006. CDR Scott J. Smith assumed command in July 2008 and was relieved by CDR Michael J. Davanzo in Aug, 2011. In June 2014, CDR Vasilios Tasikas assumed command. In June 2017, CDR John Stone assumed command. In June 2020, CDR Kristen Serumgard assumed command. In July 2022, CDR Jeannette Greene assumed command.Katmai Bay, stationed at Sault Ste. Marie, Michigan, helps the Mackinaw in ice breaking duties.

Gallery

References

 External links 

Chicago's Christmas Ship, the Mackinaw'' delivers Christmas trees annually to Chicago
Many photos, including the "splash" launch of the Mackinaw

Historic American Engineering Record in Michigan
Icebreakers of the United States Coast Guard
2005 ships
Ships built by Marinette Marine